Mettenbach may refer to:

 Mettenbach (Erlenbach), a river of Baden-Württemberg, Germany, tributary of the Erlenbach
 Mettenbach (Grabenbach), a river of Baden-Württemberg, Germany, tributary of the Grabenbach